Diane Johnstone was the first resident Australian Ambassador in Kathmandu, Nepal in 1986. Appointed at age 36, she was one of only seven women ambassadors out of 87 representing Australia at the time.

Johnstone graduated from Sydney University with a degree in economics.

References

Ambassadors of Australia to Nepal
University of Sydney alumni
Year of birth missing (living people)
Australian women ambassadors
Living people